The Tenth Seimas of Lithuania was a parliament (Seimas) elected in Lithuania. Elections took place on 12 October 2008, with the run-off on 26 October. The Seimas commenced its work on 17 November 2008 and served a four-year term, with the last session on 14 November 2012.

Elections

In the elections in 2008, 70 members of the parliament were elected on proportional party lists and 71 in single member constituencies. Elections took place on 12 October 2008. Run-off elections were held on 26 October in the single-seat constituencies where no candidate secured a seat in the first round.

Activities

Homeland Union was the largest party in the Tenth Seimas and formed a coalition government with the populist National Resurrection Party, Liberal Movement and Liberal and Centre Union. TV producer and showman Arūnas Valinskas of the National Resurrection Party was elected the Speaker of the Seimas. Ten months later, on 15 September 2009, he was removed from office in a secret ballot and two days later was replaced by Irena Degutienė of the Homeland Union, who became the first female Speaker of the Seimas.

The Seimas approved the leader of the Homeland Union Andrius Kubilius as the Prime Minister. Kubilius led the Government throughout the term.

The term of the Tenth Seimas was plagued by the Great Recession and the busting of the housing bubble. The Seimas and the Government responded with a wide-ranging tax reform, changing over 60 laws in the final days of 2008, including increasing the VAT rate and eliminating exceptions for certain products and services, increasing the corporate income tax rate, excise taxes of fuel, cigarettes and alcohol, and lowering the personal income tax rate. Due to its rushed nature the reform was much-criticized by experts and tax payers and many of the laws were later adjusted.

The reforms, together with the economic crisis and severe austerity measures, including cuts to public-sector salaries and pensions, brought about widespread dissatisfaction and protests. On 16 January 2009, more than 7,000 people gathered in front of the Seimas Palace in a protest that soon turned violent.

In the energy sector, the Seimas dissolved the energy holding company LEO LT that was expected to build the new Visaginas Nuclear Power Plant. However, the parliament approved a different project to build the power plant, with the Japanese company Hitachi as a strategic investor. The proposal failed to win an approval from Lithuanian voters in a referendum in 2012.

Several members of the Tenth Seimas were indicted for various offences, but only one was impeached and removed from office. Linas Karalius lost his mandate after taking a vacation while the Seimas was in session and having another member of the parliament, Aleksandras Sacharukas, vote in his name. Sacharucas was also indicted but narrowly won the impeachment vote.

Composition

Parliamentary groups

After the elections, the parliamentary groups were formed in the Seimas, largely on the party lines: Social Democratic Party of Lithuania (LSDPF), Labour Party (DPF), Liberal and Centre Union (LCSF), Liberal Movement (LSF), Order and Justice (FTT, also included members of the Electoral Action of the Poles in Lithuania), Homeland Union - Lithuanian Christian Democrats (TSLKDF), National Resurrection Party (TPPF) and the Mixed Group of Members of the Seimas (MSNG).

In Summer 2009, the National Resurrection Party parliamentary group, which had been part of the ruling coalition, split into "One Lithuania" (FVL) and Oak (ĄF) parliamentary groups. The former eventually former Christian Party (KPF) parliamentary group, while the latter joined with the Liberal and Centre Union.

By the end of the term of the Seimas, the following parliamentary groups were active.

Members
A total of 154 members served on the Tenth Seimas.

References

Legal history of Lithuania
21st century in Lithuania
10